Joseph Patrick Rabbitt (January 16, 1900 – December 5, 1969) was a Major League Baseball left fielder who played for one season. He played in two games for the Cleveland Indians during the 1922 Cleveland Indians season. Rabbitt was one of a group of players that Indians player-manager Tris Speaker sent in partway through the game on September 21, 1922, which was done as an opportunity for fans to see various minor league prospects.

References

External links

1900 births
1969 deaths
Major League Baseball left fielders
Cleveland Indians players
Baseball players from Kansas
People from Frontenac, Kansas